Mons is a rural residential locality in the Sunshine Coast Region, Queensland, Australia. It is part of the Buderim urban centre. In the  Mons had a population of 946 people.

History 
The name Mons commemorates a Battle of Mons that took place in 1914 during World War I in Belgium.

Buderim Road State School opened on 7 February 1916, but was soon renamed Mons State School. It closed in 1974.

The former Forest Glen Deer Sanctuary was on the Tanawha Tourist Drive. The site was redeveloped as a private mansion.

In the  Mons had a population of 683 people.

In the  Mons had a population of 946 people.

Education
There are no schools in Mons. The nearest government primary schools are Buderim Mountain State School in neighbouring Buderim to the east, Chevallum State School in neighbouring Chevallum to the south-west and Kuluin State School in Kuluin to the north-east. The nearest government secondary schools are Chancellor State College in Sippy Downs to the south-east and Maroochydore State High School in Maroochydore to the north-east.

References

Suburbs of the Sunshine Coast Region
Buderim
Localities in Queensland